The 2013–14 Admiral Vladivostok season was the ice hockey team's first season of play in the Kontinental Hockey League (KHL).

Based in Vladivostok, Russia, the team was member of the KHL, and was one of only two teams located in the Russian Far East, along with Amur Khabarovsk.

Logo

Admiral's name and logo were determined by the public. Located in the Maritime Province, its logo features a white anchor supported by hockey sticks and a ship's wheel, over-top a diagonally striped black and orange shield. The coat of arms is topped with a red star.

Standings

Divisional standings

Conference standings

Current roster

2013 KHL Expansion Draft
Admiral filled its inaugural squad on June 17, 2013 in the 2013 KHL Expansion Draft. The players selected in the extension draft are:

References

Admiral Vladivostok seasons
Vladivostok season, 2013-14
Vladivostok